Miroslav Pospíšil (27 September 1890 – 1964) was a Czechoslovak footballer. He competed in the men's tournament at the 1920 Summer Olympics. On a club level, he played for AC Sparta Prague.

References

External links
 

1890 births
1964 deaths
Czech footballers
Czechoslovak footballers
Czechoslovakia international footballers
Olympic footballers of Czechoslovakia
Footballers at the 1920 Summer Olympics
Footballers from Prague
People from the Kingdom of Bohemia
AC Sparta Prague players
Association football defenders